Stump blow-out, or duodenal blow-out, is the leakage of the blind end of the duodenum. It occurs as a complication of Billroth II gastrectomy, usually on the fourth or fifth day after surgery. It is due to improper closure of duodenal stump, especially when the duodenum is inflamed and oedematous. It can also occur because of afferent loop block, local pancreatitis and distal obstruction.
The patient who was previously convalescing satisfactorily may suddenly present with severe abdominal pain, fever and shock-like state. Jaundice may develop within 48 hours owing to the absorption of bile from peritoneal cavity. If the abdomen is drained, bile-stained fluid may be seen emerging at the drain site.
Intravenous fluids should be started and adequate surgical drainage should be provided. Surgery is indicated when there is peritonitis, unresponsive fistula or distal obstruction. Once the life-threatening phase is over, the priority should be to give adequate nutrition. Surgical loop connection relieves the obstruction distally.

See also
 Roux-en-Y anastomosis

References

Diseases of oesophagus, stomach and duodenum
Complications of surgical and medical care